Archaeological sites in Colombia are numerous and diverse, including findings and archaeological excavations that have taken place in the area now covered by the Republic of Colombia. The archaeological finds and features cover all periods since the paleolithic, representing different aspects of the various cultures of ancient precolumbian civilizations, such as the Muisca, Quimbaya and Tairona among many others. Preservation and investigation of these sites are controlled mainly by the Ministry of Culture, the National Institute of Anthropology and History, and the Bank of the Republic. The lack of funding to protect sites and enforce existing laws, results in large scale looting and illegal trading of artifacts.

List of archaeological sites

See also 

 List of pre-Columbian cultures

 
Archaeological sites
Colombia